The 1900 Kendall Orange and Black football team represented Henry Kendall College—now known as the University of Tulsa—as an independent during the 1900 college football season. Led by F. M. Whitmore in his first and only season as head coach, Kendall compiled a 2–1 record. The team defeated  (33–0) and Krebs High School (11–5) and lost to the Cherokee Male Seminary (18–0).

Schedule

References

Kendall
Tulsa Golden Hurricane football seasons
Kendall Orange and Black football